Mercy Now is the fourth studio album by Mary Gauthier.

Track listing
All tracks composed by Mary Gauthier; except where indicated

Personnel
Mary Gauthier - vocals, acoustic guitar
Gurf Morlix - acoustic and electric guitar, bass, lap steel, octophone, percussion, backing vocals
Rich Brotherton - acoustic guitar, banjo
Ian "Mac" Lagan - Hammond B3 organ
Rick Richards - drums
Ray Bonneville - harmonica
Brian Standefer - cello
Eamon McLoughlin - viola
Paul Mills, Patty Griffin - backing vocals

Critical reception
Thom Jurek at AllMusic praises "her literate American gothic songs about wasted lives, desolate characters who roam the highways like ghosts, shattered dreams, and frustrated expectations."

Jon Lusk's BBC review liked "her searing honesty, gift for gritty stories and willingness to acknowledge the darker side of life, without fear."

References
		

Mary Gauthier albums
2005 albums
Lost Highway Records albums